Hydrangea longipes is a species of flowering plant in the family Hydrangeaceae, native to western China.

References

longipes
Flora of China